Heniochus is a genus of marine ray-finned fish, butterflyfishes from the family Chaetodontidae. They are native to the Indo-Pacific. Though very similar in appearance to the Moorish idol (Zanclus cornutus), the members of this genus are not closely related to it.

Characteristics
Heniochus species are distinguished within the Chaetodontidae by having the fourth spine in the dorsal fin elongated, or even forming a filament. The supraorbital crests in adults have spines or horn-like protuberances. They normally have a hump, or at least a robust bony growth on the nape.

Etymology
Heniochus is Greek for a “carriage driver” or “coachman” and is a reference to the long, filamentous 4th dorsal spine of these fish, resembling the whip of a coachman.

Species
There are currently eight recognized species in this genus:
 Heniochus acuminatus  (Linnaeus, 1758) (Pennant coralfish)
 Heniochus chrysostomus G. Cuvier, 1831  (Threeband pennantfish)
 Heniochus diphreutes  D. S. Jordan, 1903 (False moorish idol)
 Heniochus intermedius  Steindachner, 1893 (Red Sea bannerfish)
 Heniochus monoceros  G. Cuvier, 1831 (Masked bannerfish)
 Heniochus pleurotaenia  C. G. E. Ahl, 1923 (Phantom bannerfish)
 Heniochus singularius  H. M. Smith & Radcliffe, 1911 (Singular bannerfish)
 Heniochus varius  (G. Cuvier, 1829) (Horned bannerfish)

Pictorial identification

References

 
Chaetodontidae
Marine fish genera
Taxa named by Georges Cuvier